Yanic Bercier Ph.D is a Canadian physicist and musician. Aside from being the former drummer for melodic technical death metal band Quo Vadis and the more traditional death metal band Violence Unleashed, he also sessions for other bands such as The Coalition, and Empyreal Dominion.

Career
Bercier was largely self-taught for the first 15 years of his drumming career. In 2004 he began to work with Spastic Ink drummer Bobby Jarzombek and Keith Brown, Professor in the Faculty of Music at the University of Tennessee in Knoxville. Bercier is known for his technical melodic death metal band Quo Vadis.  The band won the Canadian Metal Album of the Year Award from Chart Attack in 2001. Bercier has been featured in Modern Drummer magazine, which remarked, "This guy can play, as his blinding chop infestations and shifting time signatures on "In Contempt" and "To The Bitter End" demonstrate" (August 2005 issue).

Bercier was a member of the original Quo Vadis lineup upon the band's foundation in 1993. He played on all the band's released material to date. However, on 6 September 2008, Quo Vadis played a concert at The Medley in Montreal, at which vocalist Stéphane Paré confirmed that he and Yanic would be leaving the band.

Discography

With Quo Vadis
Quo Vadis (demo, 1995)
Forever... (full-length, 1996)
Day into Night (full-length, 2000)
Passage in Time (compilation, 2001)
Defiant Imagination (full-length, 2004)
Defiant Indoctrination (DVD, 2005)
Live In Montreal (live album, 2007)

With Empyreal Dominion
Forever the Fallen (EP, 2004)

With Violence Unleashed
Spawned to Kill (full-length, 2007)

With Gone in April
We Are But Human (full-length, 2011)
Threads Of Existence (full-length, 2016)
Shards of Light (full-length, 2019)

External links

Quo Vadis Official Site
Dr Yanic Bercier in Radiosurgery

Date of birth missing (living people)
1975 births
Living people
Canadian rock drummers
Canadian male drummers
Musicians from Montreal
21st-century Canadian drummers
21st-century Canadian male musicians